The Browning Version may refer to:

 The Browning Version (play), Terence Rattigan's 1948 play 
 The Browning Version (1951 film), starring Michael Redgrave
 The Browning Version (1994 film), starring Albert Finney